Nicolas Beaudin (born October 7, 1999) is a Canadian professional ice hockey defenceman for the Laval Rocket of the American Hockey League (AHL) as a prospect to the Montreal Canadiens of the National Hockey League (NHL).

Early life
Beaudin was born on October 7, 1999, in Châteauguay, Quebec, to parents Stephane and Annie. Growing up, Stephane played a crucial rule in Beaudin playing hockey and coached him throughout his minor hockey career.

Playing career
Beaudin was selected 39th overall by the Drummondville Voltigeurs in the 2015 CHL Draft. He was awarded the Voltigeurs Offensive Player of the Year award at the conclusion of the 2017–18 season.

In the 2018 NHL Entry Draft, he was selected 27th overall by the Chicago Blackhawks. On November 9, Beaudin signed a three-year, entry-level contract with the Blackhawks. Beaudin was also a member of No Mas ball hockey team helping guide them to a 2015 summer league championship.

Entering his fourth season within the Blackhawks organization in 2022–23, Beaudin was re-assigned to continue his tenure in the AHL with the Rockford IceHogs. Following 3 games with the IceHogs, Beaudin was traded by the Blackhawks to the Montreal Canadiens in exchange for Cameron Hillis on October 26, 2022. He was immediately re-assigned to AHL affiliate, the Laval Rocket.

Playing style

Beaudin described his playing style as emulating Toronto Maple Leafs defenceman Jake Gardiner.

Career statistics

Regular season and playoffs

International

References

External links
 

1999 births
Living people
Canadian ice hockey defencemen
Chicago Blackhawks draft picks
Chicago Blackhawks players
Drummondville Voltigeurs players
Laval Rocket players
National Hockey League first-round draft picks
People from Châteauguay
Rockford IceHogs (AHL) players